Kassoum Denon is a Malian politician. He serves as the Malian Minister of Agriculture.

References

Living people
Agriculture Ministers of Mali
Year of birth missing (living people)
Place of birth missing (living people)
21st-century Malian politicians